is the key bus terminal located in central Kumamoto, Kumamoto.

History
Kumamoto Bus terminal had been opened on March 5, 1969, gathering bus stops around Sakura-cho, Chūō-ku, Kumamoto.

Terminals
4 Platforms
36 Arrivals

Bus routes

Local bus
Kyushu Sanko Bus
Kumamoto City Transportation Bureau
Kumamoto Electric Railway
Kumamoto Bus

Express bus
Kyushu Sanko Bus
Kintetsu Bus
Iwasaki Group
Meitetsu Bus
Miyazaki Kotsu
Nangoku Kotsu
Oita Bus
Nishi-Nippon Railroad
Saihi Motor (Saihi Bus)
Transportation Bureau of Nagasaki Prefecture (Nagasaki Ken-ei Bus)

Nearby places

Kumamoto Bus Terminal Hotel
Kenmin Hyakkaten Company - closed in February 2015
Center Plaza
Kumamoto Civic Hall
Kyushu Sangyo Kotsu Holdings
Kumamoto Castle

References

External links

Kumamoto Bus Terminal

Bus stations in Japan
Buildings and structures in Kumamoto
Transport in Kumamoto Prefecture
Transport infrastructure completed in 1969
1969 establishments in Japan